Illinois Route 176 (IL 176) is a  east–west state route in northern Illinois. It runs from IL 23 (State Street) in Marengo to the southern terminus of IL 131 (Green Bay Road) in Lake Bluff.

Route description 
IL 176 is a two- to four-lane arterial in northern Illinois. The eastern terminus of IL 176 is unique in that both IL 131 and IL 176 terminate at that corner; neither state route extends beyond that point in any direction.

IL 47 overlaps IL 176 east of Marengo.

History 
SBI Route 176 originally ran from Crystal Lake to Lake Bluff. In 1941, the designation was extended westward to Marengo, replacing IL 67, redundant to the newly-designated US 67.

Future 
The village of Wauconda hired an engineering firm in 2014 to suggest improvements to the congested interchange with US 12. They proposed eliminating the interchange and converting it to an at-grade intersection with dual left turn lanes at each leg, two lanes in each direction for IL 176, three lanes in each direction of US 12, and developing the frontage of the intersection. The estimated cost to convert the US 12 interchange with IL 176 and the US 12 interchange with IL 59 to at-grade signalized arterial intersections is $300 million, none of which would come from IDOT.

Major Intersections

References 

176
Transportation in McHenry County, Illinois
Transportation in Lake County, Illinois